Branko Čubrilo (born 20 May 1988) is a Croatian professional footballer forward who plays for GOŠK Kaštel Gomilica.

Club career
Čubrilo transferred to Geylang International in 2016. He was deemed an imposing threat in the S.League and sought to emulate Croatian Miroslav Kristic in his debut season.

Though managing to a brace on one occasion, he generally performed poorly in front of goal, causing coach Hasrin Jailani to deploy him on the left-wing instead. In the end, he was  released by Geylang International to facilitate the arrival of Filipino Mark Hartmann, in mid 2016.

References

1988 births
Living people
Footballers from Split, Croatia
Association football forwards
Croatian footballers
NK Mosor players
HNK Hajduk Split players
NK Solin players
NK Vitez players
Geylang International FC players
Premier League of Bosnia and Herzegovina players
Singapore Premier League players
Kazakhstan First Division players
Kazakhstan Premier League players
Croatian expatriate footballers
Expatriate footballers in Bosnia and Herzegovina
Croatian expatriate sportspeople in Bosnia and Herzegovina
Expatriate footballers in Singapore
Croatian expatriate sportspeople in Singapore
Expatriate footballers in Kazakhstan
Croatian expatriate sportspeople in Kazakhstan